Soak It Up is a 1983 album by comedy rock group Barnes & Barnes.

Soak It Up may also refer to:
 "Soak It Up", a song on the 1983 EP of the same name
 "Soak It Up" (Monét X Change song), 2018 single by Monét X Change